Religion in the Punjab in ancient history was characterized by Hinduism and later conversions to Jainism, Buddhism, Islam, Sikhism and Christianity; it also includes folk practices common to all Punjabis regardless of the religion they adhere to. Such practices incorporate local mysticism, including ancestral worship and worship of local saints of all faiths.

Background 

The Punjabi people first practiced Hinduism, the oldest recorded religion in the Punjab region. The historical Vedic religion constituted the religious ideas and practices in the Punjab during the Vedic period (1500–500 BCE), centered primarily in the worship of Indra. The bulk of the Rigveda was composed in the Punjab region between circa 1500 and 1200 BC, while later Vedic scriptures were composed more eastwards, between the Yamuna and Ganges rivers. An ancient Indian law book called the Manusmriti, developed by Brahmin Hindu priests, shaped Punjabi religious life from 200 BC onward. 

Later, the spread of Buddhisim and Jainism in the Indian subcontinent saw the growth of Buddhism and Jainism in the Punjab. Islam was introduced via southern Punjab in the 8th century, becoming the majority by the 16th century, via local conversion. There was a small Jain community left in Punjab by the 16th century, while the Buddhist community had largely disappeared by the turn of the 10th century. The region became predominantly Muslim due to missionary Sufi saints whose dargahs dot the landscape of the Punjab region. 

The rise of Sikhism in the 1700s saw some Punjabis, both Hindu and Muslim, accepting the new Sikh faith. A number of Punjabis during the colonial period of India became Christians, with all of these religions characterizing the religious diversity now found in the Punjab region.

History

Ancient period 
The Persians were the first to use the term Hindu, referring to a vast territory containing much regional variety in belief and practice. Nevertheless, the common concept was the belief in cycles of reincarnation, or sansār, and was the oldest recorded religion in the region. While law books like the Manusmriti codified socio-religious customs and were sanctified by the Hindu religion, such books more generally influenced the formation of broader traditional societal beliefs.

Medieval period 
Sikhism appeared in the 16th century, in reaction to both Punjabi and subcontinent-wide cultural practices of the time, including asceticism, the caste system, and female subordination, as well as in congruence with it, sharing precepts with Hinduism, including karma, sansār, and liberation, and that with Islam, including a formless God, rejection of idolatry, and social equality. It also developed its own distinct doctrines, including the belief that both intrinsic factors (egocentrism, to be ameliorated through devotion and prayer), and external forces (social and political oppression, to be addressed by community service and armed self-defense as needed, and balancing spiritual and temporal power in the world as opposed to renunciation), produced suffering.

Modern period 
During the colonial era, the practice of religious syncretism among Punjabi Muslims and Punjabi Hindus was noted and documented by officials in census reports:

Punjab region

Colonial era

Modern era

West & East Punjab 

Territory comprises the contemporary subdivisions of Punjab, Pakistan and Islamabad Capital Territory.

Territory comprises the contemporary subdivisions of Punjab, India, Chandigarh, Haryana, and Himachal Pradesh.

Subregions 
Following the creation of the North-West Frontier Province in 1901, the Punjab region (Punjab Province) was divided into four natural geographical divisions by colonial officials on the decadal census data:
 Indo−Gangetic Plain West geographical division (including Hisar district, Loharu State, Rohtak district, Dujana State, Gurgaon district, Pataudi State, Delhi, Karnal district, Jalandhar district, Kapurthala State, Ludhiana district, Malerkotla State, Firozpur district, Faridkot State, Patiala State, Jind State, Nabha State, Lahore District, Amritsar district, Gujranwala District, and Sheikhupura District);
 Himalayan geographical division (including Sirmoor State, Simla District, Simla Hill States, Bilaspur State, Kangra district, Mandi State, Suket State, and Chamba State);
 Sub−Himalayan geographical division (including Ambala district, Kalsia State, Hoshiarpur district, Gurdaspur district, Sialkot District, Gujrat District, Jhelum District, Rawalpindi District, and Attock District);
 North−West Dry Area geographical division (including Montgomery District, Shahpur District, Mianwali District, Lyallpur District, Jhang District, Multan District, Bahawalpur State, Muzaffargarh District, Dera Ghazi Khan District, and the Biloch Trans–Frontier Tract).

Throughout history, religious diversity has been noted across the Punjab region. During the colonial era, the various districts and princely states that made up each of the four geographical divisions were religiously eclectic, each containing significant populations of Punjabi Muslims, Punjabi Hindus, Punjabi Sikhs, Punjabi Christians, along with other ethnic and religious minorities.

However, between the censuses of 1941 and 1951, a sudden shift towards religious homogeneity occurred in all districts across Punjab owing to the new international border that cut through the province due to the partition of India in 1947. This rapid demographic shift was primarily as a consequence of wide scale migration but also caused by large-scale religious cleansing riots which were witnessed across the region at the time. According to historical demographer Tim Dyson, in the eastern regions of Punjab that ultimately became Indian Punjab following independence, districts that were 66% Hindu in 1941 became 80% Hindu in 1951; those that were 20% Sikh became 50% Sikh in 1951. Conversely, in the western regions of Punjab that ultimately became Pakistani Punjab, all districts became almost exclusively Muslim by 1951.

Indo−Gangetic Plain West geographical division 
Including Hisar district, Loharu State, Rohtak district, Dujana State, Gurgaon district, Pataudi State, Delhi, Karnal district, Jalandhar district, Kapurthala State, Ludhiana district, Malerkotla State, Firozpur district, Faridkot State, Patiala State, Jind State, Nabha State, Lahore District, Amritsar district, Gujranwala District, and Sheikhupura District.

Districts & Princely States

Himalayan geographical division 
Including Sirmoor State, Simla District, Simla Hill States, Bilaspur State, Kangra district, Mandi State, Suket State, and Chamba State.

Districts & Princely States

Sub−Himalayan geographical division 
Including Ambala district, Kalsia State, Hoshiarpur district, Gurdaspur district, Sialkot District, Gujrat District, Jhelum District, Rawalpindi District, and Attock District.

Districts & Princely States

North−West Dry Area geographical division 
Including Montgomery District, Shahpur District, Mianwali District, Lyallpur District, Jhang District, Multan District, Bahawalpur State, Muzaffargarh District, Dera Ghazi Khan District, and the Biloch Trans–Frontier Tract.

Districts & Princely States

See also

Punjabi folk religion
Hinduism
Sikhism
Islam
Buddhism
Jainism (see Bhabra for a Punjabi community that follows Jainism)
West Punjab
Punjab, Pakistan
East Punjab
Punjab, India
Demographics of Punjab, India
Haryana
Himachal Pradesh

References

Notes

Bibliography
 

History of Punjab